Porosimetry is an analytical technique used to determine various quantifiable aspects of a material's porous structure, such as pore diameter, total pore volume, surface area, and bulk and absolute densities.

The technique involves the intrusion of a non-wetting liquid (often mercury) at high pressure into a material through the use of a porosimeter.  The pore size can be determined based on the external pressure needed to force the liquid into a pore against the opposing force of the liquid's surface tension.

A force balance equation known as Washburn's equation for the above material having cylindrical pores is given as:

 = pressure of liquid
 = pressure of gas
 = surface tension of liquid
 = contact angle of intrusion liquid
 = pore diameter

Since the technique is usually performed within a vacuum, the initial gas pressure is zero.  The contact angle of mercury with most solids is between 135° and 142°, so an average of 140° can be taken without much error.  The surface tension of mercury at 20 °C under vacuum is 480 mN/m.  With the various substitutions, the equation becomes:

As pressure increases, so does the cumulative pore volume.  From the cumulative pore volume, one can find the pressure and pore diameter where 50% of the total volume has been added to give the median pore diameter.

See also
 BET theory, measurement of specific surface
 Evapoporometry
 Porosity
 Wood's metal, also injected for pore structure impregnation and replica

References

Measurement
Scientific techniques
Porous media